The men's 1500 metres event at the 2021 European Athletics Indoor Championships was held on 4 March 2021 at 20:20 (heats), and on 5 March at 21:35 (final) local time.

Ingebrigtsen was initially disqualified for stepping out of the lane. Subsequently, the jury accepted the Norwegian team's appeal, as Ingebrigtsen had been forced to foul because he was closed by the two Polish, but had not gained any advantage from this.

Medalists

Records

Results

Heats
Qualification: First 2 in each heat (Q) and the next 4 fastest (q) advance to the Final.

Final

References

2021 European Athletics Indoor Championships
1500 metres at the European Athletics Indoor Championships